Joseph "Pepe" Forbes (17 September 1917, Gibraltar – 25 September 2013) is a Gibraltarian matchmaker and boxing agent based in London.

Career
Forbes began his working life training race horses in Spain. At the outbreak of World War II he moved to England where he found work as a boxing agent.

Forbes has worked with all the major British promoters of the last 60 years, including Jack Solomons, Barry Hearn and Frank Warren.

Awards
In 2009 Forbes was presented a special recognition by the European Boxing Union for his long and meritorious services to boxing.

References

1917 births
2013 deaths
Gibraltarian emigrants to England
British male boxers